The 1987 Navy Midshipmen football team represented the United States Naval Academy (USNA) as an independent during the 1987 NCAA Division I-A football season. The team was led by first-year head coach Elliott Uzelac.

Schedule

Roster

Game summaries

Army

Starting offensive lineman Matt Felt and Joe Brennan were held out of the game due to what head coach Elliot Uzelac called "an administrative matter not related to football".

References

Navy
Navy Midshipmen football seasons
Navy Midshipmen football